
Tower Street Adult Correctional Centre is a prison in Jamaica. It was formerly the General Penitentiary, and was built to accommodate 650 male inmates but has held over 1700 on occasions. Construction of the current building began in 1845, shortly after the end of slavery. Previously, the Kingston House of Correction stood on the same site. The new penitentiary was designed according to the 'separate system' in which prisoners are held in isolation, although in practice sharing of the small cells has been common.

It is operated by the Department of Correctional Services for the Ministry of National Security.

See also

List of prisons in Jamaica

References

External links
Aerial view.
Photos:        

Prisons in Jamaica
Buildings and structures in Kingston, Jamaica
1845 establishments in the British Empire